Blyth is a surname of Scottish origin. It is derived from the Old English pre 7th Century "blithe", meaning a happy or cheerful person.

Notable people with the surname include:

Alan Blyth (1929–2007), English musicologist
Alan Blyth (artist) (c. 1921 – 1953), English painter
Ann Blyth (born 1928), American actress
Sir Arthur Blyth (1823–1890), thrice Premier of South Australia
Benjamin Blyth (1819–1866), Scottish civil engineer
Benjamin Blyth II (1849–1917), son of the above, also a civil engineer
Bob Blyth (1870–1941), Scottish football player and manager
Chay Blyth (born 1940), Scottish yachtsman
Edward Blyth (1810–1873), English zoologist
Gavin Blyth (1969–2010), English television producer and journalist
George Blyth (died 1914), Anglican Bishop
James Blyth (1839-1906), Scottish electrical engineer
James Blyth, 1st Baron Blyth (1841–1925), British businessman
Sir James Blyth, Baron Blyth of Rowington (born 1940), British businessman
Jim Blyth (footballer, born 1890), Scottish footballer (Dumbarton FC)
Jim Blyth (footballer, born 1911), Scottish footballer (Tottenham Hotspur, Hull City, St Johnstone)
Jim Blyth (footballer, born 1955), Scottish football goalkeeper (Coventry City, Scotland)
John Blyth (died 1499), Bishop of Salisbury
Len Blyth, Wales international rugby player
Mark Blyth (born 1967), Scottish political scientist and professor at Brown University.
Reginald Horace Blyth (1898–1964), English translator of and writer about haiku, and interpreter to the West of Asian culture
Robert Henderson Blyth (1919-1970), Scottish landscape painter and artist
Tom Blyth (born 1995), English actor

See also

Blythe (surname)

References

English-language surnames
Scottish surnames